Roni Margulies (born May 5, 1955, in Istanbul, Turkey) is a Turkish poet, author, translator and political activist resident in London.

Early life
Margulies was born in İstanbul to a Jewish family. His maternal grandparents were Sephardic Jews from İzmir and his paternal grandparents were Ashkenazi Jews from Poland who settled in Turkey in 1925.

Margulies attended the English-medium Robert College and moved to London in 1972 to study Economics. He has lived in London ever since, although he has spent an increasing amount of time in Istanbul in recent years.

Literary career
Margulies started writing poetry in 1991 and won the prestigious Yunus Nadi Poetry Award in 2002 with his book of poems, Saat Fark (Time Difference). He has published selected translations of the poetry of Ted Hughes, Philip Larkin and Yehuda Amichai in Turkish, as well as Hughes’ Birthday Letters.

Political activism
Margulies is a member of the Revolutionary Socialist Workers' Party (DSIP) and translated Tony Cliff’s State Capitalism in Russia into Turkish.

References

1955 births
Living people
Turkish poets
Turkish translators
Writers from Istanbul
Socialist Workers Party (UK) members
Turkish Ashkenazi Jews
Turkish expatriates in England
Turkish Sephardi Jews
Turkish people of Polish-Jewish descent